The Conference on National Reconciliation in Somalia was an attempt to end the Somali Civil War. It led to the signing of the Addis Ababa Agreement (1993), on March 27, 1993. Fifteen different warring factions agreed to the principles of reconciliation and disarmament, but the agreement was shoaled by continued violence in Somalia. It was preceded by the Informal Preparatory Meeting on National Reconciliation.

Representatives

External resources
 The General Agreement signed in Addis Ababa on 8 January 1993
 Addis Ababa Agreement concluded at the first session of the Conference on National Reconciliation in Somalia, 27 March 1993

1993 in Somalia
1993 in politics
Somali Civil War
Politics of Somalia
Peace conferences